Matiranga is an upazila of Khagrachari District in the Division of Chittagong, Bangladesh.

Geography
It has 27,251 households and a total area of 495.39 km2.

Demographics
As of the 2011 Bangladesh census, Matiranga has a population of 126,477. Males constitute 52.38% of the population and females 47.62%. Matiranga has an average literacy rate of 44.2%.
The people of Matiranga are 66.43% Muslim, 22.92% Hindu, 10.05% Buddhist, 0.05% Christian and 0.55% others.

Administration
Matiranga Upazila is divided into Matiranga Municipality and eight union parishads: Amtali, Baranala, Belchhari, Guimara, Gumti, Matiranga, Tubalchhari, and Taindang. The union parishads are subdivided into 27 mauzas and 365 villages.

Matiranga Municipality is subdivided into 9 wards and 53 mahallas.

See also
Upazilas of Bangladesh
Districts of Bangladesh
Divisions of Bangladesh

References

Upazilas of Khagrachhari District